The  is a private museum in the Kaminoge district of Setagaya on the southwest periphery of Tokyo. It was opened in 1960, displaying the private collection of Keita Gotō, chairman of the Tokyu Group. Today's collection is centered on the original selection of classical Japanese and Chinese art such as paintings, writings, crafts and archaeological objects completed by a small selection of Korean arts. It features several objects designated as National Treasures or Important Cultural Properties. The exhibition changes several times per year with special openings in spring and fall. A garden with a tea house, ponds and small Buddhist statues is attached to the museum.

Highlights of the Collection

Genji Monogatari Emaki

One of the most important items housed in the museum are sections of the oldest extant illustrated handscroll of The Tale of Genji dating to the 12th century. This Genji Monogatari Emaki used to be the property of the Hachisuka family. The fragments cover chapters 38, 39 and 40 of the novel.
The Bell Cricket 1: one illustration (third princess with maid and hem of Genji's robe), two pages of text
The Bell Cricket 2: one illustration (conversation between Reizei and Genji at an informal concert), two pages of text
Evening Mist: one illustration (jealous Kumoi no kari is trying to snatch away a letter from her husband Yūgiri who is Genji's son), two pages of text
Rites: one illustration (exchange of poems between Genji, the dying Murasaki and Empress Akashi, her adapted daughter), three pages of text

The fragments are very fragile and are listed as National Treasure. They are displayed in the Gotoh Museum every year for about a week in April/May around the Golden Week holidays. More scrolls are housed in the Tokugawa Art Museum in Nagoya.

Murasaki Shikibu Diary Emaki
Another important item and National Treasure of the museum collection are 13th century fragments of a handscroll of the Murasaki Shikibu Diary with illustrations. Three illustrations and three pages of text are housed in the museum. The items are displayed in the Gotoh Museum every year for about a week in autumn. More fragments are housed in the Fujita Art Museum in Osaka.

See also
List of National Treasures of Japan (archaeological materials)
List of National Treasures of Japan (paintings)
List of National Treasures of Japan (writings)

References

External links 

Art museums and galleries in Tokyo
Art museums established in 1960
1960 establishments in Japan